The Washington Independent Review of Books is a volunteer organization that operates a website for book reviews. It was founded by a group of writers in the Washington, D.C., area.

References

External links

Book review websites
American websites